The Saint Scholastica Convent, now the Saint Scholastica Monastery, is a historic religious facility at 1301 South Albert Pike Avenue in Fort Smith, Arkansas.  It is a large multi-winged brick and masonry complex with Late Gothic Revival architecture, five stories in height, set on a large landscaped property behind Trinity Junior High School.  The building was designed by Oklahoma City architect F. W. Redlich, and was built in 1923–24.  It originally housed living quarters for the convent as well as a chapel and school; the school closed in 1969, and the academic space is now leased to the Trinity School.

The property was listed on the National Register of Historic Places in 2006.

As of June 1, 2022 the building is slated for demolition after the sisters made the decision to not move forward with any restoration efforts.

Gallery of photos

See also
National Register of Historic Places listings in Sebastian County, Arkansas

References

External links
St. Scholastica Monastery web site

Properties of religious function on the National Register of Historic Places in Arkansas
Gothic Revival architecture in Arkansas
Buildings and structures in Fort Smith, Arkansas
National Register of Historic Places in Sebastian County, Arkansas